Lieutenant General Sir John Paul Foley,  (born 22 April 1939) is a retired British Army officer with a long career in military intelligence. He is the great-grandson of Henry Hodgetts-Foley, and was educated at Bradfield College.

Military career
Foley joined the Special Air Service as an enlisted man during his National Service. He served in BRIXMIS during the 1970s. He was commissioned into the Rifle Brigade in 1959 and rose to become Director SAS in 1983. He was later Director of General Intelligence, which involved ensuring intelligence provision in the theatre of war and making assessments for government ministers at the time of the Gulf War in 1990, and became Commander of British Forces in Hong Kong in 1992, before being named Chief of Defence Intelligence in 1994. He left that post, retiring from the Army three years later, in 1997.

Later life
In October 1999, he replaced Sir William Rous as Chairman of the British Greyhound Racing Board but resigned just six months later. In 2000, he was appointed Lieutenant Governor of Guernsey, and served in that post for five years before retiring to his native Herefordshire. He was appointed High Sheriff of Herefordshire and Worcestershire in 2006 and Vice-Lieutenant of Herefordshire in 2010.

References

|-

|-

|-

|-

1939 births
Living people
British Army lieutenant generals
Deputy Lieutenants of Herefordshire
Knights Commander of the Order of the Bath
Officers of the Order of the British Empire
Recipients of the Military Cross
Rifle Brigade officers
Royal Green Jackets officers
Special Air Service officers
Special Air Service soldiers
High Sheriffs of Herefordshire
People from Herefordshire
High Sheriffs of Worcestershire
People educated at Bradfield College
John
Schuyler family
Van Cortlandt family
English people of Dutch descent
Military personnel from Herefordshire
People in greyhound racing